Anita, Lady May (born 29 April 1949), known as Anita Dobson, is an English stage, film and television actress, and singer. She is best known for her role from 1985 to 1988 as Angie Watts in the BBC soap opera EastEnders. In 1986, she reached number four in the UK Singles Chart with "Anyone Can Fall in Love", a song based on the theme music of EastEnders. She is married to Queen guitarist and astrophysicist Sir Brian May.

Dobson's other television roles include the 1989 ITV sitcom Split Ends. In 2003, she was nominated for the Olivier Award for Best Actress for the National Theatre production of Frozen. She has also starred in the West End as Mama Morton in the musical Chicago (2003) and Gertrude in Hamlet (2005), and made her RSC debut in the 2012 revival of The Merry Wives of Windsor. Her film appearances include Darkness Falls (1999) and London Road (2015).

Early life
Dobson was born in Stepney, London.  She trained at the Webber Douglas Academy of Dramatic Art in London.

Career
Dobson appeared in several series in the early 1980s including the Jim Davidson sitcom Up the Elephant and Round the Castle (1983). She is best known for playing the emotionally battered and alcoholic landlady Angie Watts in BBC1 soap opera EastEnders, a role she played from the show's inception in 1985 until 1988.

EastEnders
Dobson was not the first person to be cast as Angie – another actress, Jean Fennell, had already begun recording when it was decided that her performance did not "gel" with the original idea of the character, and Dobson was substituted in the role. Whilst playing Angie Watts, alcoholic landlady of the Queen Vic, Dobson worked closely with actor Leslie Grantham, landlord of the Queen Victoria who played her adulterous husband 'Dirty Den Watts'. On Christmas Day in 1986, 30.15 million viewers tuned in to witness Den handing Angie her divorce papers, giving the soap its highest ever episode rating, which has yet to be surpassed by any other soap in the UK.

Since leaving EastEnders in 1988, BBC executives made numerous offers for her to return, but she did not accept any of the offers; she later commented: "Why tarnish the gorgeous creation that was Angie Watts?" Executives finally decided she could not be persuaded to return, and in 2002 the character of Angie Watts died off-screen of alcohol poisoning and was brought home to be buried by her on-screen daughter Sharon Watts (Letitia Dean), who had returned to the show the previous year.

Other roles
Since leaving EastEnders Dobson has appeared in many television, film and theatre roles, including the BBC sitcoms Red Dwarf, Rab C. Nesbitt and her own sitcom series Split Ends (1989), which lasted for only one series. She has also made guest appearances in the BBC dramas Dangerfield (1995), Ghosts (1995), Sunburn (1999) and Hotel Babylon (2007), and the ITV detective series The Last Detective (2004) among others, along with the films Sweet Revenge (1998) and Darkness Falls (1999). She has also been reunited with fellow EastEnder Leslie Grantham in the Sky production called The Stretch and Five's Horror series Urban Gothic (2000).

Dobson worked on the ITV1 police drama The Bill in 2005 and appeared in the radio Doctor Who serial Blood of the Daleks. Dobson has also played five different guest characters in the BBC1 medical drama Casualty, appearing in episodes in October 2000, July 2009, July 2011, March 2013 and October 2017; she also had two guest roles in Casualtys sister series, Holby City, in September 2003 and December 2014 respectively. Dobson featured in the film London Road in 2015 and appeared alongside Simon Callow in the Gold comedy series The Rebel in 2016.

She was the subject of This Is Your Life in 2002 when she was surprised by Michael Aspel.

On 20 January 2023, it was announced that Dobson would be guest starring in the fourteenth series of Doctor Who. Her casting was announced alongside Michelle Greenidge.

Musical and stage career
Dobson has also performed as a singer, with varying degrees of chart success. In August 1986 she reached No. 4 in the UK Singles Chart with "Anyone Can Fall in Love", a song based on the theme music of EastEnders, which was written by Simon May. The song was produced by Queen guitarist Brian May, who later became her husband. She has also released several other singles and albums with minor chart success.

On stage Dobson has starred in repertory at Salisbury Playhouse in Shaw's Pygmalion in 1980; the 1981 Ray Davies/Barrie Keeffe musical Chorus Girls and as Hazel Fletcher in the short-lived musical Budgie with Adam Faith. She also appeared in the revived Tom Stoppard musical Rough Crossing and played a holocaust survivor in My Lovely Shayna Maidel. She also appeared as Mama Morton in the West End musical Chicago.

Dobson played the role of Gertrude in the English Touring Theatre production of Hamlet, at the New Ambassadors Theatre in London's West End, following a UK tour in autumn 2005.

In 2012, Dobson played the role of Mistress Quickly in the Royal Shakespeare Company production of The Merry Wives of Windsor.

From September 2016 to January 2017, Dobson appeared as Madame Morrible in the musical Wicked at the Apollo Victoria Theatre in London.

In June 2019, Anita joined Trevor Nunn's West End revival of Fiddler On The Roof at the Playhouse Theatre playing the role of Yente, alongside Maria Freidman taking on the role of Golde, until the production's closure on the 2nd November 2019.

Strictly Come Dancing
On 6 September 2011, it was announced that Dobson would take part in the 2011 series of Strictly Come Dancing. In the launch show of ninth series on 10 September 2011, it was revealed that she would be partnered by Latin specialist Robin Windsor. She was eliminated on 27 November 2011 after Robin Windsor had been unable to dance for a week due to an injury. Anita Dobson therefore rehearsed and danced the Cha Cha Cha and the Swingathon with Brendan Cole.

In Week 6 Jennifer Grey guest judged for Goodman.

Awards
For her time on EastEnders as Angie Watts, Dobson received the Pye Award for Outstanding Female Personality.

Dobson was nominated for a 2003 Laurence Olivier Award for Best Actress for her performance in Frozen at the Royal National Theatre: Cottesloe.

In 2007, Dobson was made a Companion of the Liverpool Institute for Performing Arts.

Personal life
Dobson is a patron of The Match Girls' Memorial. She married Brian May on 18 November 2000. They had first met in 1986. She is a patron of the theatre charity the Music Hall Guild of Great Britain and America.

In December 2021, her husband said both of them had tested positive for COVID-19, but were recovering.

Filmography

Film

Television

Theatre Credits

References

External links

1949 births
Alumni of the Webber Douglas Academy of Dramatic Art
English film actresses
English soap opera actresses
English stage actresses
English television actresses
Living people
People from Stepney
BBC Records artists
Wives of knights
20th-century English actresses
21st-century English actresses
Actresses from London